The Croatian Trade Union Association  (HUS) is a trade union centre in Croatia.

External links
 www.hus.hr

References
 

Trade unions in Croatia
Trade unions established in 1990